Holy Ascension Church is in Church Lane, Upton-by-Chester, Chester, Cheshire, England.  It is an active Anglican parish church in the deanery of Chester, the archdeaconry of Chester and the diocese of Chester.  The church is recorded in the National Heritage List for England as a designated Grade II listed building.

History

Holy Ascension Church was designed by James Harrison, and built between 1853 and 1854.  Transepts were added in 1958 and in 1967 by A. C. Bennett, working with the Design Group Partnership.

Labour Party former Deputy Prime Minister John Prescott married his wife Pauline (nee Tilston) at this church in 1961.

Architecture

The church is constructed in red sandstone rubble with ashlar dressings, and has a red tile roof.  Its plan consists of a five-bay nave, a south porch, a two-bay chancel with north and south transepts, and a west tower.  The tower is in three stages, standing on a plinth.  It has diagonal buttresses, two-light windows, louvred bell openings and a plain parapet.  The tower is surmounted by a spire containing lucarnes.  The nave windows have two lights, there are three-light windows in the transepts, and east window also has three lights.  Stained glass is by Kempe; that in the west window is dated 1883, in the east window it is dated 1885, and elsewhere there are windows dated between 1871 and 1873.  The two-manual organ was made by Charles Whiteley and Company.

Churchyard

The churchyard contains Commonwealth war graves of three British Army soldiers of World War I and two soldiers and an airman of World War II.

See also

Listed buildings in Upton-by-Chester

References

Church of England church buildings in Cheshire
Grade II listed churches in Cheshire
Churches completed in 1967
Diocese of Chester
Gothic Revival church buildings in England
Gothic Revival architecture in Cheshire
Holy Ascension Church
Cheshire West and Chester